Commune Council may refer to:

 Commune Council (Cambodia)
 Commune Council (Paris), government during the 72-day Paris Commune in 1871